Nadine Audin (born 3 April 1958) is a French gymnast. She competed at the 1972 Summer Olympics and the 1976 Summer Olympics.

References

1958 births
Living people
French female artistic gymnasts
Olympic gymnasts of France
Gymnasts at the 1972 Summer Olympics
Gymnasts at the 1976 Summer Olympics
Place of birth missing (living people)
20th-century French women